Debola Ogunseye (born April 27, 1988 in Lagos) is a Nigerian footballer who currently plays for TKİ Tavşanlı Linyitspor in the Turkish TFF First League.

Career

College and amateur
Ogunseye attended Olabisi Onabanjo University in his native Nigeria, and was part of the team which won the 2005 West African University Games and a silver medal in the Nigerian University Football League. He moved to the United States in 2006 after being offered a scholarship to attend and play college soccer at Newberry College in Newberry, South Carolina.

At Newberry he was named to the All-SAC first team, the Daktronics All-Appalachian Region second team and the NSCAA Appalachian Region first team as a freshman, to the all-SAC First Team and the All-Appalachian Region first teams by Daktronics and the NSCCA as a sophomore, and earned NSCAA All-Southeast Region honors as a junior in 2008, before transferring to Furman University prior to his senior year. He is ranked second in Newberry history with 48 goals, 19 assists and 115 total points.

During his college years Ogunseye also played in the USL Premier Development League (PDL) with Mississippi Brilla, earning All-Conference and All-League honors and being named a finalist for the PDL most valuable player award.

Professional
Undrafted out of college, Ogunseye signed with the Charlotte Eagles of the USL Second Division after taking part in the 2010 USL Men's Player Showcase. He made his professional debut on April 17, 2010, in a game against Charleston Battery, and scored his first professional goal on May 14, 2010 in a 2-1 win over the Pittsburgh Riverhounds. He remained with Charlotte for three months before signing with Turkish side Kartalspor on July 28, 2010.

Ogunseye later moved to fellow TFF First League side TKİ Tavşanlı Linyitspor.

References

External links
 Charlotte Eagles bio
 Furman bio
 Newberry bio

1988 births
Living people
Yoruba sportspeople
Sportspeople from Lagos
Newberry College alumni
Nigerian footballers
Furman Paladins men's soccer players
Mississippi Brilla players
Charlotte Eagles players
Nigerian expatriates in the United States
USL League Two players
USL Second Division players
Expatriate soccer players in the United States
Kartalspor footballers
TKİ Tavşanlı Linyitspor footballers
Olabisi Onabanjo University alumni
Association football forwards